Lucius Calpurnius Piso Caesoninus was the son of Lucius Calpurnius Piso Caesoninus, consul in 148 BC.

He was consul in 112 BC, with Marcus Livius Drusus. In 107 BC, he served as legate to the consul, Lucius Cassius Longinus, who was sent into Gaul to oppose the Cimbri and their allies, and he fell together with the consul in the battle, in which the Roman army was utterly defeated by the Tigurini in the territory of the Allobroges.

Family
This Piso was the grandfather of Lucius Calpurnius Piso Caesoninus, the father-in-law of Julius Caesar, a circumstance to which Caesar himself alludes in recording his own victory over the Tigurini at a later time.

References

100s BC deaths
Year of birth unknown
Roman generals killed in action
2nd-century BC Roman consuls
Calpurnii Pisones
Senators of the Roman Republic
People of the Cimbrian War